The Holy Cross Mountains Brigade was a tactical unit of the Polish National Armed Forces established on 11 August 1944. It did not obey orders to merge with the Home Army in 1944 and was a part of the Military Organization Lizard Union faction. Its soldiers fought simultaneously with the Nazi German and the communist underground, though it sometimes collaborated with the Nazis to further its anti-Jewish and anti-Communist goals,

Second Polish Republic background
In 1934, within the National Party (Stronnictwo Narodowe, SN), a secret radically right-wing faction emerged, known as the Internal Organization. They were critical in respect to the democratic traditions of the SN and in April 1934 gave rise to the splinter National Radical Camp (Obóz Narodowo Radykalny, ONR). The movement was quickly delegalized by the Sanation regime and many ONR activists ended up in the Bereza Kartuska camp for political opponents. In 1935 the ONR split further into the National Radical Camp Falanga and the National Radical Camp "ABC", the latter dominated by members of the Internal Organization. The ONR "ABC" promoted an extreme "social-national" ideology, which included the call for expulsion of the ethnic minorities in Poland, specifically in the Kresy macro-region especially the Germans, Lithuanians, Belarusians, Ukrainians and Jews, and allowing only ethnically pure Polish members of the organization in state leadership positions.

World War II background

After the Polish defeat in September 1939, the ONR "ABC" people formed the conspiratorial Szaniec Group. They refused to recognize the authority of the Polish government-in-exile. Szaniec's Military Organization Lizard Union (ZJ) did not become associated with the Home Army (AK), the main Polish underground force. Together with a splinter group from the National Military Organization (NOW) they created the National Armed Forces (NSZ), but the NSZ leaders soon became engaged in rivalry and disagreements over the issue of reaching an understanding with the Polish Underground State and acknowledging the Home Army command, which the individuals from the Lizard Union continued to refuse to do. The rivalry became violent to the point of the Szaniec faction murdering NSZ officers who joined the AK. The split resulted in the establishment of a conspiracy known as the NSZ-ONR, whose leaders, obsessively preoccupied with the issues of treason and pro-communist "fifth column" even killed the top NSZ commander, Stanisław Nakoniecznikow, whom they previously installed themselves. At the time of the formal Polish-Soviet alliance (1941–43), the "NSZ Declaration" equally considered Nazi Germany and the Soviet Union enemies and stressed the organization's determination to fight communist attempts to establish their rule in Poland.

Creation
The Soviet military successes on the Eastern Front caused the NSZ to adjust its program in mid-1943. Because of indirectly benefiting the Soviet Union, anti-German activities were to be discouraged. The main enemies were now considered to be the Soviet Union and its "communist agencies" in Poland: the Gwardia Ludowa (GL) and its successor Armia Ludowa (AL), the Polish Workers' Party (PPR) and the Soviet partisans, who were active also in Poland.

Lacking a large military unit, the nationalists issued on 11 August 1944 an order establishing the Holy Cross Mountains Brigade. The brigade was created in August 1944 in the Kielce region out of the 204th infantry battalion and Special Action Groups of the NSZ-ZJ. It varied in number from 822 soldiers in December 1944 to 1418 soldiers in May 1945. The purpose of the brigade was the realization of the political and military program of the NSZ. The commander of the brigade was Colonel Antoni Szacki ("Bohun-Dabrowski").

Military engagements in Poland

The formation fought against the Germans (among others at Brzeście, Zagnańsk, Caców, and Marcinkowice), the Soviet NKVD forces, the Polish communist partisans of the Armia Ludowa (at Fanisławice and Borów) and once against the peasant partisans of the Bataliony Chłopskie (BCh) when they cooperated with communist partisans.

Although the brigade occasionally fought the Germans, it avoided confrontations with the occupier and stressed a "clearing of the Polish territories of red banditry". The brigade's major success was its defeat of a joint Armia Ludowa and Soviet partisans force in a battle fought on 8 September 1944 near Rząbiec. The battle took place after a patrol of the brigade was captured by the communist formations, and its members tortured and slated for summary execution. One of the captured prisoners managed to escape and alerted the brigade to the situation. The brigade attacked and defeated the AL and Soviet soldiers. The Soviet captives were executed and several Poles of the AL who were accused of banditry as well. Thirteen of the captured Polish communists joined the brigade. In individual actions units of the brigade killed several hundred members and sympathizers of the PPR and the AL, in what one historian, Rafał Wnuk, described as a bloody and brutal civil war fought between communists and nationalists in the Kielce province.

Evacuation out of Poland

As the Soviet Red Army approached Poland, the leaders of the NSZ-ONR decided to evacuate the brigade to the territories controlled by the Western Allies. In January 1945 it began a retreat through Silesia into the Protectorate of Bohemia and Moravia. At first the brigade was attacked by the Germans because it lacked their permission for the movement. By January 15 the consent was obtained and the retreat continued. The partisans received German food rations and accepted Wehrmacht and Gestapo liaison officers to accompany them during the trip.

In April 1945, now in the Protectorate of Bohemia and Moravia, the brigade found itself in an area surrounded by substantial German forces and its German contacts began insisting on closer collaboration. As a result, the commanders of the brigade agreed to a limited plan whereby small units of the force were to cross or be parachuted by the Germans back into Poland in order to carry out intelligence work and possibly sabotage at the rear of the advancing Red Army. According to former soldiers, they were all instructed by the brigade's command to ignore their German assigned tasks once in Poland and instead try to make contact with NSZ headquarters. Out of the units sent, two turned around and made their way back to the main force, while several ran into Soviet and Polish communist forces and were liquidated. During the same period, the second in command, Władysław Marcinkowski pseudonym "Jaxa", took part in a German sponsored conference involving various collaborationist and fascist organizations during which, according to Marcinkowski, the Germans made an offer of forming a Vlasov style formation out of the brigade. Marcinkowski refused the offer and tried to stall by claiming not to have the authority to agree to it.

According to the historian Rafał Wnuk, the brigade command dispatched about one hundred men to the German intelligence Abwehr training center, from where most of them were sent or were in process of being sent to Poland for anti-Soviet diversionary activities.

Marcinkowski, along with Hubert Jura, pseudonym "Tom", who was the main liaison officer between the Germans and the brigade, were members of the extreme-right faction Szaniec within the NSZ-ZJ (which was itself a far-right faction of the pre-1944 NSZ). Jura's role in the actions undertaken by the unit during this time have not been fully explained. Jura was a Gestapo or SD agent and he used internal politics of the NSZ-ZJ to settle personal scores (under the guise of "fighting communism within NSZ-ZJ"). There were outstanding death sentences for collaboration issued against him by both the Home Army and the portion of the pre-1944 NSZ which merged with it.

While the brigade was in Bohemia, Col. Szacki made contacts with the anti-German Czech underground and became involved in clandestine plans for an uprising in Plzeň.

On 5 May the Brigade liberated a part of the Flossenbürg concentration camp at Holýšov. The brigade made contact with the U.S. Third Army on 6 May 1945. On the following day, the brigade fought alongside troops of the U.S. 2nd Infantry Division in the assault that liberated Plzeň and restored it to Czechoslovakia.

Following the end of the war in Europe, the presence of the brigade in Czechoslovakia became a contentious political issue for the U.S. forces. The British War Office declined to accept the brigade as a reinforcement unit for the Polish forces under their command. On 6 August 1945, the brigade was disarmed and moved to a displaced persons camp in Coburg. Subsequently, men of the brigade were used in the formation of 25 Polish guard companies in the American-occupied zone of Germany. The U.S. CIC kept tabs on the brigade's leadership during this time as the U.S. Army did not want any incidents with the Soviet forces. The brigade was demobilized on 17 June 1946 and, under the pressure from communist diplomacy, most of the Polish guard companies were disbanded in 1947. Some of the senior officers of the brigade resettled in the United States.

The Holy Cross Mountains Brigade tried to join the Polish Armed Forces in the West, but the Polish government-in-exile in London did not agree to allow members of a formation which did not cooperate with the Home Army, did not recognize the Polish Underground State, and collaborated with the Germans to become recognized combatants of the Polish Armed Forces. In the years that followed, the brigade veterans repeatedly sought the status of former Polish soldiers but their petitions were denied until 1988.

Nazi collaboration

Extent of collaboration 
Documents uncovered in the German Federal Archives in Koblenz contain correspondence between the Gestapo and the NSZ (National Armed Forces) indicating close collaboration as far as tracking Jews was concerned. This included in particular the Holy Cross Mountain brigade in the district of Radom. By the end of 1943 and beginning of 1944, the cooperation of the brigade with the German police in the Radom district acquired a permanent character. This cooperation included the lookout for Jews hiding in the forests to deliver to the Germans. In 1944, members of the High Command of the Home Army were abducted from their offices by the NSZ and handed to the Germans.

During the closing days of the war, on 13 January 1945, the 850-strong Brigade began, with German approval and under German protection, the trek westward through Silesia to Czechoslovakia. They were permitted to continue to march southwest to Bohemia, where their unit was confined at an encampment in March. The collapsing Third Reich was hoping to use the Holy Cross Brigade for propaganda purposes and to deploy it at the front On 6 May 1945, the Holy Cross Brigade made its way to the American-occupied zone of Germany.

The Polish command agreed to assign a small number of volunteer troops to be sent, including by air, behind the Soviet lines. The volunteers were given confidential orders to shoot any German assigned to them upon landing. In any event, no Germans were attached, and a small number that made it back to Poland promptly reported back to the NSZ leadership and re-entered the struggle against the communists.

The brigade refused participation in the anti-German military Operation Tempest; this lack of participation was allegedly aimed at preventing the communist takeover of Poland.

According to the Polish Institute of National Remembrance, there were no documented cases of Holy Cross Brigade soldiers directly murdering Polish Jews due to their ethnic origin. Representative of the veterans Jan Józef Kasprzyk described the claims of Nazi collaboration as a product of postwar communist propaganda meant to smear the unit's legacy. This opinion was not agreed by prof. Andrzej Friszke.

Collaboration in Home Army reports 
As stated in reports by the Polish Home Army, the brigade was well armed and trained and operated in an almost open environment, and its units were resented by the civilian population. The head of the intelligence service of the Home Army Kielce Inspectorate noted that the cooperation with the Gestapo "was basically open and individual commanders did not hide the fact that they received weapons and ammunition to fight against communism from the occupying authorities". A report of the commander of the Home Army in the Radom district from 2 January 1945 states: "The clear cooperation with Germans and the plague of the society as a result of the use of props. On November 22nd, during the march of the NSZ through Oleszno, the Germans pulled in the posts. Contacts with the Gestapo are recorded." Another note of the Home Army reports on NSZ officers discussing the manhunts on the PPR.

Other 
The agrarian People's Party, one of the main components of the Underground State, accused the NSZ and its Holy Cross Mountains Brigade of contacts with and enjoying support of the Germans. The movement's periodicals described the extreme nationalists as "openly treasonous", and of being a "political fascist creation". After the end of the war, the People's Party under the leadership of Wincenty Witos decided to support Stanisław Mikołajczyk. However at the same time Polish communists named one of their proxy parties , and the old People's Party, now loyal to Mikołajczyk, changed its name into Polish People's Party (PSL). After Mikołajczyk's defeat in the rigged 1947 Polish legislative election, the remains of the Polish People's Party were merged (in 1949) into the communist-allied United People's Party (ZSL).

See also
 Detached Unit of the Polish Army (operating in the same region several years earlier)
 National Armed Forces

Notes

Further reading

Brigades of Poland
Military units and formations established in 1944
Units and formations of Polish resistance during World War II
History of Lesser Poland
Polish collaborators with Nazi Germany
Collaborators with Nazi Germany
Military units and formations disestablished in 1946
1944 establishments in Poland
1946 disestablishments in Poland